Sternocleidomastoid branch may refer to:

 Sternocleidomastoid branch of superior thyroid artery
 Sternocleidomastoid branches of occipital artery